Penryn (meaning 'promontory') is a civil parish and town in west Cornwall, England, United Kingdom. The population was 7,166 in the 2001 census and had been reduced to 6,812 in the 2011 census, a drop of more than 300 people across the ten-year time gap. There are two electoral wards covering Penryn: 'Penryn East and Mylor' and 'Penryn West'. The total population of both wards in the 2011 census was 9,790.

Though now the town is overshadowed by the larger nearby town of Falmouth, Penryn was once an important harbour in its own right, lading granite and tin to be shipped to other parts of the country and world during the medieval period.

History

Early history

The ancient town first appears in the Domesday Book under the name of "Trelivel", and was since founded and named Penryn in 1216 by the Bishop of Exeter. The borough was enfranchised and its Charter of Incorporation was made in 1236. The contents of this Charter were embodied in a confirmation by Bishop Walter Bronescombe in the year 1259. In 1265, a religious college, called Glasney College, was built in Penryn for the Bishop of Exeter to develop the church's influence in the far west of the diocese. In 1374, the chapel of St Thomas (sometimes called St Mary's) was opened. Standing at the head of the Penryn River, Penryn occupies a sheltered position and was a port of some significance in the 15th century. After the Dissolution of the Monasteries by King Henry VIII and the disestablishing of the Roman Catholic church, Glasney College was dissolved and demolished in 1548 during the brief reign of Edward VI, the first Protestant Duke of Cornwall and afterwards King of England. The dissolution of Glasney College helped trigger the Prayer Book Rebellion of 1549.

Later history

From 1554, Penryn held a parliamentary constituency, which became Penryn and Falmouth in 1832. The constituency was abolished in 1950, Penryn becoming part of the Falmouth and Camborne constituency. It received a royal charter as a borough in 1621, mainly in a bid by the crown to cure the town of piracy. At least three mayors of Penryn were convicted of piracy between 1550 and 1650. The arms of the borough of Penryn were a Saracen's head Or in a bordure of eight bezants.
The merchant traveller and writer Peter Mundy (c.1600–67) was the son of a Penryn pilchard trader and travelled extensively throughout his life in Asia (where he was one of the first Europeans to taste Chaa), Russia and Europe before returning to Penryn to write his Itinerarium Mundi ('World Itinerary'); one of the earliest travel guides in English.

By the mid-17th century, the port was thriving from trade in Cornish fish, tin and copper. However, Penryn lost its custom house and market rights to the new town of Falmouth as a direct result of supporting the Parliamentary side in the English Civil War (1642–48).

In the early 19th century, granite works were established by the river and large quantities of the stone were shipped from its quays for construction projects both within the UK and abroad.

The town is the setting of the play The Penryn Tragedy, which tells of a young man unwittingly murdered by his parents after disguising himself as a rich stranger.

Present-day Penryn

Today, Penryn is a quiet town and has retained a large amount of its heritage. A large proportion of its buildings date from Tudor, Jacobean and Georgian times; the town has therefore been designated as an important conservation area. The local museum is housed in Penryn Town Hall. The town hall building is partly 17th century and partly 19th century in date; its clock tower is dated 1839.

Education

Higher education

In 2004, the Penryn Campus was completed, creating the hub of the Combined Universities in Cornwall (CUC) project. It includes the University of Exeter housing the 6th best Ecology Department in the world and Camborne School of Mines, which has moved from Camborne, where it has been for over a century, among other departments of the University of Exeter. The Campus also houses departments of Falmouth University, which is based in the centre of Falmouth. In 2007, phase two was completed, which includes increased student accommodation and new teaching areas.

Schools
There are currently two schools in Penryn:
 Penryn Primary Academy (a merging of Penryn Infants and Junior Schools)
 Penryn College

Transport

Penryn railway station was opened by the Cornwall Railway on 24 August 1863. It is towards the northwest end of the town and is served by regular trains from Truro to Falmouth on the Maritime Line.

Sport and leisure
Penryn RFC, founded in 1872, is a rugby union club which plays in the Tribute Western Counties West league, the seventh tier of the English rugby union league system. They are nicknamed "The Borough" and are the oldest rugby club in Cornwall.

Penryn Athletic (founded 1963; also known as "The Borough") is a non-League football club who play at the 1,500-capacity Kernick Road ground. The club is a member of the South West Peninsula League Division One West, which is a step 7 league in the national league system.

In 2021, Penryn-based Cornwall R.L.F.C. joined the third tier of professional Rugby league, RFL League 1.

The English Shinty Association is based in Penryn.

Policing
The policing of the area is the responsibility of Devon and Cornwall Police who have a dedicated team to cover the area known as the Penryn & Mylor Local Policing Team.

Notable residents
 John Coode, Reverend, Colonel, Captain, revolutionary, and Governor of Maryland 1689–1691
 Thomas Pellow, author and former slave.
 Jonathan Hornblower, English pioneer of steam power.
 Emma Hosken, novelist, born in Penryn.
 Vic Roberts, British Lion and England rugby union international, born in and played for Penryn RFC. 
 William Harris Rule, Methodist missionary, was born in Penryn 1802.
 John Tucker Williams, Canadian soldier and politician, was born in Penryn.
 Violetta Thurstan, World War I nurse, died in Penryn in 1978 aged 99.

See also

Kernick

Footnotes

References
 Roddis, Roland, Penryn, The History of an Ancient Cornish Borough, 1964
 Warmington, Ernie, Penryn: People, Places, Postcards, Photographs, 1998, Published by the author, reprinted 2007
 Warmington, Ernie, Around Penryn (Images of England series), Stroud: Tempus Publishing, 2000, 
 Warmington, Ernie, Penryn Revisited, Stroud: Tempus Publishing, 2007, 
 Warmington, Ernie, Penryn Through Time, Amberley Publishing, 2010, 
 Hallett, Christine E., ‘Nurses of Passchendaele: Caring for the Wounded of the Ypres Campaigns 1914-1918’, Pen & Sword History, 2017,

External links

 Cornwall Record Office Online Catalogue for Penryn

 
Towns in Cornwall
Civil parishes in Cornwall
Populated coastal places in Cornwall